In constructive mathematics, a set  is inhabited if there exists an element   In classical mathematics, this is the same as the set being nonempty; however, this equivalence is not valid in intuitionistic logic (or constructive logic).

Comparison with nonempty sets

In classical mathematics, a set is inhabited if and only if it is not the empty set.  These definitions diverge in constructive mathematics, however.  
A set  is  if  while  is  if it is not empty, that is, if 

It is  if 

Every inhabited set is a nonempty set (because if  is an inhabitant of  then  is false and consequently so is ). 
In intuitionistic logic, the negation of a universal quantifier is weaker than an existential quantifier, not equivalent to it as in classical logic so a nonempty set is not automatically guaranteed to be inhabited.

Example

Because inhabited sets are the same as nonempty sets in classical logic, it is not possible to produce a model in the classical sense that contains a nonempty set  but does not satisfy " is inhabited". But it is possible to construct a Kripke model  that satisfies " is nonempty" without satisfying " is inhabited".  Because an implication is provable in intuitionistic logic if and only if it is true in every Kripke model, this means that one cannot prove in this logic that " is nonempty" implies " is inhabited".

The possibility of this construction relies on the intuitionistic interpretation of the existential quantifier.

For example, consider a subset  of  specified by the following rule:  belongs to  if and only if the Riemann hypothesis is true, and  belongs to  if and only if the Riemann hypothesis is false.

See also

References

 D. Bridges and F. Richman. 1987. Varieties of Constructive Mathematics. Oxford University Press. 

Basic concepts in set theory
Concepts in logic
Constructivism (mathematics)
Mathematical objects
Set theory